The president of Benin is both head of state and head of government in Benin. The Cabinet of Benin is under the authority of the President, and serves to advise and help formulate strategies. It also liaises with ministries and other government institutions.

A total of seven people have served as President (not counting two acting presidents, several interim military officeholders and a collective presidency). Additionally, one person, Mathieu Kérékou, has served on two non-consecutive occasions.

Description of the office

Election
The President of the Republic shall be elected by direct universal suffrage for a mandate of five years, renewable only one time.

In any case, no one shall be able to exercise more than two presidential mandates.

The election of the President of the Republic shall take place with a uninominal majority ballot in two rounds.

No one may be a candidate for the office of President of the Republic unless:

 He is of Béninese nationality at birth or shall have acquired it for at least ten years;
 He is of good morality and of great honesty;
 He enjoys all his civil and political rights;
 He is at least 40 years old but not more than 70 years old at the date of the filing of his candidacy;
 He resides in the territory of the Republic of Bénin at the time of the elections;
 He enjoys a satisfactory state of physical and mental well-being duly verified by a collegiate board of three doctors sworn and designated by the Constitutional Court.

The President of the Republic shall be elected by an absolute majority of votes cast. If that shall not be obtained in the first round of voting, it shall be followed, after a delay of fifteen days, by a second round.

The only ones who may be presented in the second round of balloting shall be the two candidates who shall have received the greatest number of votes in the first round. In case of the withdrawal of one or both of the two candidates, the next ones shall be presented in the order of their filing after the first balloting.

The candidate having received the relative majority of votes cast in the second round shall be declared elected.

The convocation of the electors shall be made by a decree issued in the Council of Ministers.

The first round of balloting for the election of the President of the Republic shall take place at least thirty days and at most forty days before the expiration date of the powers of the President in office.

The mandate of the new President of the Republic shall take effect by counting from the expiration date of the mandate of his predecessor.

Oath of office
Before taking his office, the President of the Republic shall take the following oath:

This oath shall be received by the President of the Constitutional Court before the National Assembly and the Supreme Court.

Vacancy
In case of vacancy of the Presidency of the Republic by death, resignation or permanent impediment, the National Assembly shall reconvene in order to rule on the case with an absolute majority of its members. The President of the National Assembly shall refer the matter to the Constitutional Court which shall certify it and declare the vacancy of the Presidency of the Republic. The duties of President of the Republic, with the exception of those mentioned in Articles 54 paragraph 3, 50, 60, 101, and 154 shall be temporarily exercised by the President of the National Assembly.

The election of a new President of the Republic shall take place thirty days at the least and forty days at most after the declaration of the permanent nature of the vacancy.

In case of bringing an accusation of the President of the Republic before the High Court of Justice, his interim shall be assumed by the President of the Constitutional Court who shall exercise all the duties of President of the Republic with the exception of those mentioned in Articles 54 paragraph 3, 58, 60, 101 and 154.

In case of absence from the territory, of illness and of vacation of the President of the Republic, his interim shall be assumed by a member of the Government whom he shall have designated and within the limitation of powers that he shall have delegated to him.

List of officeholders

Latest election

See also
Vice President of Benin
List of prime ministers of Benin
List of colonial governors of Dahomey
Politics of Benin

References

External links
 1990 Constitution of Benin 

1960 establishments in the Republic of Dahomey
Government of Benin